Balai of Qenneshrin, was a Syriac saint who lived in Qinnasrin in the 5th century CE.

Very little is known about his early life. It has been suggested that he might have been a native of Edessa who later moved to Qinnasrin after being ordained a monk.

A collection of sermons is attributed to him as well as a number of hymns found in Beth Gazo.

References

Syriac writers